Maggie Smith is an American poet, freelance writer, and editor who lives in Bexley, Ohio.

Smith's poem "Good Bones," originally published in the journal Waxwing in June 2016, has been widely circulated on social media and read by an estimated one million people. A Wall Street Journal story in May 2020 described it as "keeping the realities of life's ugliness from young innocents," citing that the poem has gone viral after catastrophes such as the 2016 Orlando nightclub shooting, the May 2017 suicide bombing at a concert in Manchester, U.K., the 2017 mass shooting in Las Vegas, and the coronavirus pandemic. PRI called it "the official poem of 2016".

Early life 
Smith was born in Columbus, Ohio, in 1977. She received her Bachelor of Arts from Ohio Wesleyan University in 1999, and then went on to receive her Master of Fine Arts from Ohio State University in 2003.

Career 
From 2003 to 2004, Smith served as the Emerging Writer Lecturer for Gettysburg College. She went on to take a position as an assistant editor with a children's trade book publisher. She worked there for two years, and became an associate editor. Eventually, she decided to make the switch to freelance work.

As a poet, she has been published widely, with individual poems appearing in The Paris Review, The Gettysburg Review, The Iowa Review, The Southern Review, Virginia Quarterly Review, Shenandoah, iamb and other journals.

Her work has also been widely anthologized in From the Other World: Poems in Memory of James Wright; The Year’s Best Fantasy & Horror 2008; Apocalypse Now: Poems and Prose from the End of Days, and The Helen Burns Anthology: New Voices from the Academy of American Poets University & College Prizes, Volume 9.

In January 2022, when the board of trustees of McMinn County Schools in Tennessee, in a 10-0 decision, removed the Pulitzer Prize-winning Holocaust graphic novel Maus from its curriculum for 8th grade English classes, overriding a State curriculum decision, Smith  was critical of the decision. She tweeted: "We’ve lost our damn minds if we think that to keep kids safe in school, we need to ban books, not assault weapons".

Honors and awards 
 National Endowment for the Arts fellowship in creative writing
 Sustainable Arts Foundation, Fall 2014
 Ohio Arts Council Individual Excellence Award 2007, 2010
  2016 Independent Publisher Book Award, Gold Medal in Poetry

Published works

Full-length poetry collections
 Goldenrod (One Signal Publishers, 2021)
 Good Bones (Tupelo Press, 2017)
 The Well Speaks of Its Own Poison (Tupelo Press, 2015)—winner of the 2012 Dorset Prize
 Lamp of the Body (Red Hen Press, 2005)—winner of the Benjamin Saltman Award Poetry Award

Chapbooks
 Disasterology (Dream Horse Press, 2016)—winner of the 2013 Dream Horse Press Chapbook Prize
 The List of Dangers (Kent State University Press, 2010)—winner of the Wick Poetry Series Chapbook Competition
 Nesting Dolls (Pudding House, 2005)

Essay collections
 Keep Moving: Notes on Loss, Creativity and Change (One Signal Publishers, 2020)

References

1977 births
Living people
Poets from Ohio
Ohio Wesleyan University alumni
Ohio State University Graduate School alumni
Gettysburg College faculty
American women poets
21st-century American poets
21st-century American women writers
Writers from Columbus, Ohio
People from Bexley, Ohio
American women academics